The Fourth Federal Electoral District of Chiapas (IV Distrito Electoral Federal de Chiapas) is one of the 300 Electoral Districts into which Mexico is divided for the purpose of elections to the federal Chamber of Deputies and one of 12 such districts in the state of Chiapas.

It elects one deputy to the lower house of Congress for each three-year legislative period, by means of the first past the post system.

District territory
The Fourth District of Chiapas is located in the north-western portion of the state and
covers the municipalities of Amatán, Berriozábal, Coapilla, Copainalá, Ixtacomitán, Ixtapangajoya, Juárez, Ocozocoautla de Espinosa, Ostuacán, Pichucalco, Reforma, San Fernando, Solosuchiapa, Sunuapa and Tecpatán.

The district's head town (cabecera distrital), where results from individual polling stations are gathered together and collated, is the city of Ocozocoautla de Espinosa.

Previous districting schemes

1996–2005 district
Between 1996 and 2005, the Fourth  District had a different configuration. It was still centred on Ocozocoautla de Espinosa but covered:
Berriozábal, Coapilla, Copainalá, Ocozocoautla de Espinosa, San Fernando and Tecpatán, as at present, plus:
The municipalities of Chicoasén, Ocotepec, Osumacinta, Suchiapa and Villaflores.

Deputies returned to Congress from this district

L Legislature
 1976–1979: Manuel Villafuerte Mijangos (PRI)
LI Legislature
 1979–1982: Salvador de la Torre Grajales (PRI)
LII Legislature
 1982–1985: Oralia Coutiño Ruiz (PRI)
LIII Legislature
 1985–1988:
LIV Legislature
 1988–1991: Sami David David (PRI)
LV Legislature
 1991–1994:
LVI Legislature
 1994–1997: Tito Rubín Cruz (PRI)
LVII Legislature
 1997–2000: Mario Elías Moreno Navarro (PRI)
LVIII Legislature
 2000–2003: José Jacobo Nazar Morales (PRI)
LIX Legislature
 2003–2006: Julián Nazar Morales (PRI)
LX Legislature
 2006–2009: Andrés Carballo Bustamante (PRI)

References 

Federal electoral districts of Mexico
Government of Chiapas